Ma Jian may refer to:

 Muhammad Ma Jian (马坚, 1906–1978), Chinese Confucian scholar and Islamic jurist
 Ma Jian (writer) (马建, born 1953), Chinese writer
 Ma Jian (politician) (马建, born 1956), former Vice Minister of State Security of China
 Ma Jian (basketball) (马健, born 1969), Chinese basketball player and occasional actor
 Jian Ma (computer scientist) (马坚), American computer scientist at Carnegie Mellon University working on computational biology